Mohamed Diop (born May 14, 1981) is a Senegalese basketball player for UGB and the Senegalese national team, where he participated at the 2014 FIBA Basketball World Cup.

References

External links
 Eurobasket.com profile

1981 births
Living people
Power forwards (basketball)
Senegalese expatriate basketball people in Angola
Senegalese expatriate basketball people in Peru
Senegalese expatriate basketball people in Spain
Senegalese expatriate basketball people in the United States
Senegalese men's basketball players
Small forwards
2014 FIBA Basketball World Cup players